Young America may refer to:

Places

United States 
Young America, Indiana
Young America, Wisconsin
Norwood Young America, Minnesota
Young America Township, Carver County, Minnesota
Young America Township, Edgar County, Illinois
Young America Lake, a lake in Minnesota

Media
Young America (1897 film), a short film
Young America (1932 film), starring Spencer Tracy
Young America (1942 film), starring Jane Withers
Young America (1918 film), starring Madelyn Clare
Young America (magazine)
The Sound of Young America, now called Bullseye with Jesse Thorn, a public radio program

Politics
Young America movement, a political and cultural movement in the U.S. during the mid-nineteenth century
Young America's Foundation, a 20th-century conservative group
Young Americans for Freedom, a similarly named organization

Other
Young America Corporation, an engagement and promotional marketing company
Young America (clipper), an 1853 clipper ship built by William Henry Webb
Young America (1994 yacht) (USA–36), an America's Cup yacht sailed by Dennis Conner's team in the 1995 America's Cup
Young America (1999 Farr yacht) (USA–53), an America's Cup yacht designed by Bruce Farr sailed in the 2000 Louis Vuitton Cup in Auckland, New Zealand
Young America (1999 MacLane yacht) (USA–58), an America's Cup yacht designed by Bruce MacLane sailed in the 2000 Louis Vuitton Cup in Auckland, New Zealand

See also
Young Americans (disambiguation)